The 1992 Atlantic hurricane season was a significantly below average season, but it did feature Hurricane Andrew, the costliest Atlantic hurricane known at the time, surpassing Hugo of 1989 and later surpassed by Katrina of 2005. The season officially began on June 1, 1992, and lasted until November 30, 1992. The first storm, an unnamed subtropical storm, developed in the central Atlantic on April 21, over a month before the official start of hurricane season. On August 16, Hurricane Andrew formed and would later strike the Bahamas, as well U.S. States of Florida and Louisiana, becoming the costliest Atlantic hurricane on record until the record was surpassed just over 13 years later. Andrew caused $27.3 billion (1992 USD) in damage, mostly in Florida, as well as 65 fatalities. In addition, Andrew was also the strongest hurricane of the season, reaching winds of  while approaching Florida.

Later in the season, just under one month after Andrew struck land three times, Hurricanes Bonnie and Charley produced tropical storm-force winds in the Azores, and the former caused one fatality. Tropical Storm Danielle was one of few tropical cyclones known to make landfall on the Delmarva Peninsula. The storm caused minor damage and two fatalities in the Mid-Atlantic and New England regions of the United States. One other hurricane in the season—Frances—did not significantly affect land. The system developed in the central Atlantic, and tracked well away from land, and brought only light rainfall to Newfoundland. In addition to the seven storms, there were three non-developing tropical depressions. The first depression of the season caused flooding in Cuba and Florida while the other two depressions did not affect any land. Collectively, the storms in the 1992 Atlantic hurricane season caused $27.3 billion in losses and 73 fatalities.

Seasonal forecasts

Pre-season forecasts

Forecasts of hurricane activity are issued before each hurricane season by Dr. William M. Gray and his associates at Colorado State University (CSU) and the Weather Research Center (WRC). A normal season as defined by the National Oceanic and Atmospheric Administration (NOAA) has 12.1 named storms, of which 6.4 reach hurricane strength, and 2.7 become major hurricanes. In December 1991, CSU issued its first forecast for the year and predicted that 1992 would see eight named storms, four hurricanes, and one major hurricane. CSU also issued a forecast in April, June and August; however, no revisions were made to the numbers of named storms, hurricanes, and major hurricane predicted in 1992.
Prior to the season starting, the WRC predicted that the season would see six named storms, with three of those becoming a hurricane while no forecast was made on the numbers of major hurricanes.

Season summary 

The Atlantic hurricane season officially began on June 1, but activity in 1992 began more than a month earlier with the formation of Subtropical Storm One on April 21. It was a below average season in which 10 tropical or subtropical depressions formed. Seven of the depressions attained tropical storm status, and four of these attained hurricane status. In addition, one tropical cyclone eventually attained major hurricane status, which is below the 1981–2010 average of 2.7 per season. The low amount of activity is partially attributed to weaker than normal tropical waves, the source for most North Atlantic tropical cyclones. Only two hurricanes and one tropical storm made landfall during the season. However, damage from Hurricane Andrew was astronomical, causing most of the season's 73 deaths and $27.3 billion (1992 USD) damage toll. The last storm of the season, Hurricane Frances, became extratropical on October 27, over a month before the official end of the season on November 30.

Tropical cyclogenesis in the 1992 Atlantic hurricane season began with the development of Subtropical Storm One on April 21. However, over the next three months, minimal activity occurred, with only two depressions developing, one in June and the other in July. Although wind shear was relatively weak in August, only one tropical cyclone occurred in that month. However, that one tropical cyclone, Hurricane Andrew, was the strongest and costliest of the season. Though September is the climatological peak of hurricane season, an increase in wind shear prevented tropical cyclogenesis in the first half of the month. After September 16, however, five tropical cyclones developed in a span of nine days, from September 17 to 26. Thereafter, activity abruptly halted, and only one tropical cyclone developed in October, Hurricane Frances. By October 27, Frances became extratropical, ending season activity.

The season's activity was reflected with an accumulated cyclone energy (ACE) rating of 76. ACE is, broadly speaking, a measure of the power of the hurricane multiplied by the length of time it existed, so storms that last a long time, as well as particularly strong hurricanes, have high ACEs. It is only calculated for full advisories on tropical systems at or exceeding 39 mph (63 km/h), which is the threshold for tropical storm strength.

Systems

Subtropical Storm One 

The system maintained a large comma-shaped cloud pattern around the low-level circulation. Operationally, it was not classified until 27 hours later. It gradually became better organized, with a large convective band in the eastern semicircle.

The National Hurricane Center remarked the potential for the system transitioning into a tropical cyclone. An approaching trough caused the storm to stall and weaken the deep convection. On April 23, the cyclone weakened to depression status due to strong wind shear. A hurricane hunter's flight into the system confirmed the weakening, and also reported a 1.8 °F (1 °C) temperature rise in the center, suggesting a warm core and some tropical characteristics. Early on April 24, the subtropical depression turned eastward, maintaining limited convection. At the time, forecasters anticipated the depression would continue east-northeastward and become an extratropical cyclone. By late on April 24, the system was too weak to classify using the Dvorak technique, and the NHC ceased issuing advisories. Within 24 hours, the circulation dissipated as the system continued eastward through the westerlies.

Tropical Depression One 

A tropical wave emerged off the western coast of Africa on June 12, and eventually developed into Tropical Depression One in the southeastern Gulf of Mexico. Operationally, the National Hurricane Center designated this system as Tropical Depression Two, which led to confusion because of Subtropical Storm One in April, and then another Tropical Depression Two in July. Outflow from Hurricane Celia in the Pacific Ocean and a trough in the Gulf of Mexico generated wind shear on the depression, which prevented it from intensifying into a tropical storm. The depression curved north-northeastward and eventually made landfall in near Tampa, Florida, on June 26 around 1500 UTC. As it was moving ashore, the National Hurricane Center noted that the depression was too poorly organized to locate the center of circulation, and discontinued advisories on the system.

Large amounts of precipitation resulted in flooding, which damaged or destroyed hundreds of homes and caused two fatalities in provinces of Pinar del Río and La Habana. Heavy rainfall fell on the west coast of Florida, with local amounts exceeded . Heavy rainfall caused flooding in portions of Florida, which in turn, damaged 4,000 houses and destroyed 70 houses. In addition, five homes destroyed and twelve were damaged by a tornado spawned in Nokomis. Severe crop damage to orange trees was also reported. The depression caused two fatalities in Florida and damage totaled to $2.6 million (1992 USD).

Tropical Depression Two 

A squall line which moved offshore New York and southern New England formed a mesoscale convective vortex, which fired new thunderstorm activity each day as it moved within the westerlies across the northern Atlantic. Once it reached mid-ocean, an increasingly northerly steering flow dropped the system down into the subtropics to the east of Bermuda, and it maintained decent organization. By 2100 UTC on July 24, the National Hurricane Center began classifying the system as Tropical Depression Two. In the first advisory on the depression, it was noted that the previous tropical depression was erroneously classified as Tropical Depression Two.

Due to northeasterly wind shear, the depression failed to intensified or organize further, as predicted. Instead, the depression weakened by late on July 25, with satellite imagery indicating that much of the deep convection was removed from the surface circulation. By July 26, the National Hurricane Center issued its final advisory, noting that it was "too weak to classify and is rapidly losing its identity". The depression dissipated about three hours later.

Hurricane Andrew 

A tropical wave moved off the coast of Africa on August 14, and organized into Tropical Depression Three on August 16 while located about halfway between the Windward Islands and the coast of Africa. It moved to the west-northwest, and strengthened into Tropical Storm Andrew on August 17. It bypassed the Lesser Antilles completely, and turned to the west in response to a building high pressure system to the north. Upon turning to the west, a trough of low pressure positioned to the southwest of Andrew created an environment with little vertical shear and well-defined outflow. The storm quickly intensified due to its small size, and became a hurricane on August 22. It crossed the Bahamas at that intensity, weakened slightly, and re-intensified to a  Category 5 hurricane before making landfall near Homestead, Florida. It weakened slightly over the state to a  hurricane, but restrengthened to a  hurricane over the Gulf of Mexico. A strong mid-latitude trough turned Andrew northward, where it greatly weakened before hitting west of Morgan City, Louisiana on August 26 as a  Category 3 hurricane. It turned northeastward, and lost its tropical identity over Tennessee on August 28, before merging with the remnants of Hurricane Lester and another frontal system over Pennsylvania on August 29.

In the Bahamas, Andrew brought high tides, hurricane-force winds, and tornadoes, which caused significant damage in the archipelago, especially on Cat Cays. At least 800 houses were destroyed and left damage to the transport, communications, water, sanitation, agriculture, and fishing sectors. Overall, Andrew caused four fatalities and $250 million in damage in the Bahamas. High winds caused catastrophic damage in Florida, especially in Miami-Dade County, where approximately 117,000 houses were either severely damaged or destroyed. In the Everglades, 70,000 acres (280 km2) of trees were knocked down and about 182 million fish were killed. Significant damage to oil platforms was reported, with one company losing 13 platforms, had 104 structures damaged, and five drilling wells blown off course. In Louisiana, Andrew produced hurricane-force winds along its path, damaging 23,000 homes and destroying 985 homes and 1,951 mobile homes. An F3 tornado in St. John the Baptist Parish damaged or destroyed 163 structures. 17 fatalities were reported in Louisiana, six of which were drowning victims offshore. Elsewhere, the storm spawned at least 28 tornadoes, especially in Alabama, Georgia, and Mississippi. Overall, Andrew caused 65 fatalities and $27.3 billion (1992 USD) in damage, making it the ninth-costliest hurricane in U.S. history, behind Hurricane Katrina in 2005, Hurricane Ike in 2008, Hurricane Sandy in 2012, hurricanes Harvey, Irma, Maria in 2017, Hurricane Florence in 2018, and Hurricane Ida in 2021 and Hurricane Ian in 2022

Hurricane Bonnie 

Early on the following day, the depression intensified into Tropical Storm Bonnie. Due to light vertical wind shear, Bonnie quickly strengthened, and became a hurricane late on September 18. Further deepening occurred, and at 1800 UTC on September 21, Bonnie peaked as a  Category 2 hurricane. Thereafter, Bonnie became nearly stationary for almost 24 hours. Satellite images indicated that the low-level center became exposed, indicating that Bonnie was significantly weakening while tracking southward. It is estimated that Bonnie weakened to a tropical storm by late on September 24. Bonnie further deteriorated to tropical depression status on September 26, but re-strengthened to a tropical storm later that day.

By 1500 UTC on September 27, the National Hurricane Center declared Bonnie extratropical, since it was losing tropical characteristics. Bonnie re-acquired tropical characteristics, and the National Hurricane Center resumed advisories on the storm by 2100 UTC on September 28. However, post-analysis indicated that Bonnie remained tropical during that time period. Bonnie re-strengthened to a strong tropical storm before vertical wind shear weakened it while approaching the Azores. Shortly before becoming extratropical on September 30, Bonnie passed through the Azores as a moderately weak tropical storm. One location in the Azores reported tropical storm force winds. In addition, one man was killed by a rock fall on the island of São Miguel. No damage was reported in association with Bonnie.

Hurricane Charley 

On September 20, METEOSAT imagery indicated an area of convection becoming concentrated while well south of the Azores. It is possible that a mid to upper-level cyclonic circulation interacted with the northern portion of a tropical wave. The depression tracked northwestward and satellite imagery began to indicate banding features. As a result, the depression was upgraded to Tropical Storm Charley on September 22. An eye developed as Charley tracked north-northwestward, and it became a hurricane on September 23. Further strengthening occurred, and by late on September 24, Charley peaked as a  Category 2 hurricane.

Thereafter, Charley turned eastward and then east-northeastward while tracking over decreasing sea surface temperatures (SST). Early on September 27, Charley was downgraded to a tropical storm. Charley gradually lost tropical characteristics, and by 1800 UTC on September 27, it had transitioned into an extratropical storm. The remnant system accelerated northeastward toward the British Isles, where it merged with another extratropical low on September 29. No other effects from Charley were reported in the Azores.

Tropical Storm Danielle 

Tropical Depression Six developed offshore of the Southeastern United States on September 22 from the merger of a surface trough, a tropical wave, and a cold front. The depression quickly intensified and was upgraded to Tropical Storm Danielle six hours later. An approaching trough caused a northeastward movement, but later a high pressure system forced the storm to northwestward, which caused Danielle to execute a small anti-cyclonic loop on September 23–24. It was initially predicted that Danielle would make landfall in North Carolina; however, the storm curved north-northwestward and made landfall in Maryland on the eastern shore of the Delmarva Peninsula at the same intensity. Danielle continued inland and weakened and dissipated over eastern Pennsylvania on September 26.

Danielle caused severe beach erosion in North Carolina, Virginia, and Maryland, which resulted in overwash, which in turn, damaged or destroyed several businesses and houses in the coastal portions of the three states. In addition, street flooding also closed several roads in the region, most notably, North Carolina Highway 12. Many states in the Mid-Atlantic and New England also reported rainfall, although rarely exceeding . In addition high seas offshore of New Jersey capsized a sailboat, causing two people to drown. Overall, damage from the storm was minimal, with the exception of the damaged or destroyed businesses and houses in North Carolina, Virginia, and Maryland.

Tropical Depression Seven 

Because the depression was tracking over warm SST, it was predicted to intensify into a tropical storm. However, wind shear exposed the center as indicated by visible satellite images on September 26, and the National Hurricane Center noted on September 26 that "the depression could be downgraded to a tropical wave later today". Early on September 27, the center of the depression became difficult to locate on satellite imagery.

By September 28, the organization of the depression deteriorated further due to strong vertical wind shear. The center of the depression again became difficult to location by infrared images early on September 29. Later that day, a few computer models indicated a decrease in wind shear over the depression within two days, thus, it was predicted to strengthen into a tropical storm. However, wind shear exposed the center of the depression again by early on September 30, though it was still forecast to intensify to tropical storm status. By late on October 1, satellite imagery noted that the depression dissipated, and the National Hurricane Center issued its final advisory on the system.

Tropical Storm Earl 

The depression tracked west-northwestward toward the Bahamas. Initially, the depression remained weak, but after reaching the Gulf Stream it strengthened into Tropical Storm Earl at 1200 UTC on September 29. Around that time, Earl began to veer east, lessening the threat to Florida. It gradually weakened thereafter, and Earl was downgraded to a tropical depression on October 3.

The threat from Earl prompted a tropical storm watch in the Bahamas and later Bermuda, while a coastal flood watch was issued in Florida. Because Earl remained offshore, impact was generally minor. Throughout Florida, Earl spawned 11 tornadoes and brought moderately heavy rainfall, peaking at  near Canal Point, Florida. In addition, light amounts of precipitation were also reported in Georgia and North Carolina. Above normal tides washed away  of beaches, and lifeguards on St. Augustine Beach made eight rescues.

Hurricane Frances 

A low pressure area developed along the end of a quasi-stationary frontal trough. Initially, vertical wind shear prevented deep convection from forming on the western portion of the system. After wind shear decreased, the system became a gale center late on October 22. By early on the following day, the gale center had transitioned into a tropical storm, and it is estimated that Tropical Storm Frances developed at 0600 UTC on October 23. Frances quickly strengthened after becoming a tropical storm, and was upgraded to a hurricane by 1800 UTC on that same day. After becoming a hurricane, Frances curved northeastward, and remained well east of Bermuda. By midday on October 24, Frances peaked as an 85 mph (140 km/h) Category 1 hurricane.

After reaching peak intensity, Frances began tracking over cooler sea surface temperatures, which gradually weakened the storm. The eye featured became indistinct and by late on October 25, Frances was downgraded to a tropical storm. Over the next two days, Frances began losing tropical characteristics, and was declared extratropical by early on October 27. One sailor was reported missing; however, it is unknown if it was as a result of Frances. In addition, one person on a sailboat suffered injuries during an encounter with Frances. On land, Frances caused minimal impact, limited to light rainfall across Newfoundland.

Storm names 
The following names were used for named storms that formed in the North Atlantic in 1992. Subtropical storms were unnamed until 2002, as a result, the subtropical cyclone in April 1992 did not receive a name. The names not retired from this list appeared again on the naming list for the 1998 season. This is the same naming list used for the 1986 season.

Retirement 

At their meeting in the spring of 1993, the World Meteorological Organization retired the name Andrew from the list above. The name that replaced it on the naming list for the 1998 season was Alex.

Season effects 
This is a table of all of the storms that formed in the 1992 Atlantic hurricane season. It includes their duration, names, landfall(s)—denoted by bold location names—damages, and death totals. Deaths in parentheses are additional and indirect (an example of an indirect death would be a traffic accident), but are still related to that storm. Damage and deaths include totals while the storm was extratropical or a wave or low, and all of the damage figures are in 1992 USD.

See also 

 Lists of Atlantic hurricanes
 Atlantic hurricane season
 1992 Pacific hurricane season
 1992 Pacific typhoon season
 1992 North Indian Ocean cyclone season
 South-West Indian Ocean cyclone season: 1991–92, 1992–93
 Australian region cyclone season: 1991–92, 1992–93
 South Pacific cyclone season: 1991–92, 1992–93

References

External links 
 Monthly Weather Review
 U.S. Rainfall information concerning 1992 tropical cyclones
 Clips of Weather Channel coverage of 1992 Atlantic hurricane season

 
Articles which contain graphical timelines